Philip John Priestley CBE FRSA (29 August 1946 – 24 September 2022) was a British diplomat.

He was educated at Boston Grammar School and at the University of East Anglia (BA). He served as British Ambassador to Gabon from 1990–1991, and as British High Commissioner to Belize from 2001-2004. He was a fellow at the Weatherhead Center for International Affairs at Harvard University from 1991-1992.

References

1946 births
2022 deaths
People educated at Boston Grammar School
Alumni of the University of East Anglia
Ambassadors of the United Kingdom to Gabon
High Commissioners of the United Kingdom to Belize
Commanders of the Order of the British Empire